The Madison Elementary School in Ogden, Utah, USA is a building built in 1892. It was listed on the National Register of Historic Places in 1982.

It was designed by architect Francis Charles Woods.

References

Defunct schools in Utah
Buildings and structures in Ogden, Utah
Schools in Weber County, Utah
School buildings on the National Register of Historic Places in Utah
National Register of Historic Places in Weber County, Utah